Sean McGaughey (born 8 May 1962) is a former Scottish international rugby union player who played for the Scotland national team.

Rugby Union career

Amateur career

McGaughey played for Hawick.

Provincial career

He played for South of Scotland District in Scottish Inter-District Championship. He won the 1983–84 Scottish Inter-District Championship with the South team.

International career

He was capped by Scotland 'B' once, on 19 February 1984 against France 'B'. Scotland 'B' won the match 13-10. McGaughey was replaced by his club captain Billy Murray in the match. McGaughey was injured and taken to hospital, but luckily he was only diagnosed with a bruised back.

He was capped once by the full senior Scotland side in 1984. He played against Romania. Romania won 28-22 and it was McGaughey's only senior cap.

Prior to the match he got bored and did 21 pull ups from his hotel balcony to celebrate his 21st birthday. He was 9 floors up.

He went on the 1985 Scotland rugby union tour of North America and 1988 Scotland rugby union tour of Zimbabwe, but these were non-cap matches.

He played for the Barbarians in 1984.

References

1962 births
Living people
Scotland 'B' international rugby union players
Scotland international rugby union players
Scottish rugby union players
Barbarian F.C. players
Hawick RFC players
South of Scotland District (rugby union) players